Senator Sinagra may refer to:

Anthony Sinagra (born 1940), Ohio  State Senate
Jack Sinagra (1950–2013), New Jersey State Senate